The 2020 All-Ireland Minor Football Championship was the GAA's premier inter-county Gaelic football competition for under seventeens. Thirty-one county teams from Ireland competed.

2018 was the first minor competition for under 17-year-olds – previously the competition had an under eighteen age limit. The under seventeen championship with a new format was introduced after a vote at the GAA Congress on 26 February 2016.

The championship is straight knockout.

The winning team receives the Tom Markham Cup.

Due to the impact of the COVID-19 pandemic on Gaelic games, the competition was not completed until July 2021 with Derry beating Kerry in the final.

Munster Minor Football Championship

Munster final

Leinster Minor Football Championship

Leinster final

Connacht Minor Football Championship

Connacht final

Ulster Minor Football Championship

2020 in Gaelic football
All-Ireland Minor Football Championship
All-Ireland Championship